Thomas Saikhom (born 20 September 1982) is an Indian professional footballer who plays as a defender for NEROCA FC in the I-League.

Career

Rangdajied United
Saikhom made his professional debut for Rangdajied in the I-League on 29 September 2013 against Bengaluru FC at the Bangalore Football Stadium and played the whole match; as Rangdajied lost the match 3–0.

Career statistics

References

1982 births
Living people
Indian footballers
Footballers from Manipur
Rangdajied United F.C. players
I-League players
Association football defenders
NEROCA FC players